Lobão may refer to:

People
 Lobão (footballer), Brazilian former footballer Fabrício Almeida Carvalho (born 1972)
 Edison Lobão (born 1936), Brazilian politician, former governor of the state of Maranhão and former minister of mines and energy
 Rodrigo Lobão or simply Lobão, Brazilian footballer Rodrigo da Conceição Santos (born 1993)
 Lobão (musician), Brazilian singer-songwriter, composer, musician, writer, publisher, television host João Luiz Woerdenbag Filho (born 1957)

Other uses
 Lobão (Santa Maria da Feira), Portugal, a former civil parish
 Lobão, a synonym of the Tinta Carvalha, a Portuguese wine grape variety